Rajputs of Nepal or anciently Rajputras are Rajput Kshatriya community of Nepal. 

There were various historical groups of Rajputs from ancient and medieval India that have immigrated to Kathmandu valley, Khas Malla Kingdom, Western hill regions and other Terai territories. The Nepalese dynasty of Indian plain origin were Lichhavis who entitled themselves with the archaic title Rajputra. The heavy Rajput immigration into Nepal began on the rise of Muslim conquests in the Indian subcontinent after the 12th century CE. These Rajputs particularly settled in Kathmandu valley, as well as in the various hills of the Himalayan ranges specially the Western-Central Nepal. Those Rajput groups in the Western Nepal led into disintegration of Khas Malla Kingdom and formation of large number of confederated states called Baise Rajya and Chaubisi Rajya. The Rajputs of the Kathmandu Valley established marital relations with the Newar Malla rulers of the Kathmandu valley, who were of Rajput origin themselves. Notable of these Malla Rajputs was the famed ruler Jayasthiti Malla who established Hindu reforms and social regulations among the Newar people of Kathmandu Valley. Rajput families from Indo-Gangetic plain were routinely invited by the Mallas of the Kathmandu valley and a new noble class of courtiers, presently called "Thakoo/Thakur" and part of the Chatharīya Srēstha caste, were developed from the descendants of the plain Rajputs in the Malla court. The Shah court also heavily favored Rajputs as legal regulations in the Kingdom of Nepal were inclined to them making them one of the Hindu high caste in the Tagadhari group and a faction not permitted to be enslaved in Nepal.

Some writers are of the opinion that the Rajputs of Nepal, are of spurious descent and many families claimed Rajput descent for political purposes.

Legends and Chronicles
Lichhavis were the first Nepalese dynasty of Indian plain origin who began their rule in the 4th or 5th century. Historian Baburam Acharya in an interview asserts that Amshuverma and the Lichhavi rulers were all Rajputs and Kshatriyas. Lichchavi inscription self describes them as Rajputras (princes). Rajputras who were ranked Kshatriyas, had special role in politics during the Lichchavi period. The Lichchavi inscription of Sikubahi (Shankhamul) mentions about Rajputra  Vajraratha, Rajputra Babharuvarma, and Rajputra Deshavarma. Rajputra Babharuvarma and Rajputra Deshavarma were Dutakas (diplomats) in the reign of King Gangadeva and Amshuvarma respectively.  Similarly, the Lichchavi inscription of Sanga mentions the name of Rajputra Vikramasena who was a Dandanayaka (judge). The Lichchavi inscription of Deopatan mentions Rajputra Shurasena as well as the inscriptions of Adeshwar mention the names of Rajputra Nandavarma, Rajputra Jishnuvarma and Rajputra Bhimavarma. Thus, historian Dhanavajra Vajracharya concludes that Rajputra of Kshatriya ranks were found abundantly in the topmost position in the Lichchavi court.
The Baleshwar Inscription of King Krachalla (or Krachalla Deva) of Khas Malla Kingdom at capital Dullu self proclaimed that he belonged to a Buddhist Jina family of hill Rajput background. The inscription mentions his two regional chiefs (Mandalikas) as Rawat Rajas.

Few groups of Hindus including Rajputs were entering Nepal before the fall of Chittor due to regular invasions of Muslims in India. After the Fall of Chittorgarh in 1303 by the Alauddin Khilji of the Khalji dynasty, Rajputs from the region immigrated in large groups into Nepal due to heavy religious persecution. The incident is supported by both the Rajasthani and Nepalese traditions. Indian scholar Rahul Ram asserts that the Rajput immigration into Nepal is an undoubted fact but there can be questions in purity of blood of some leading families. Historian James Todd mentions that there was a one Rajasthani tradition that mentions the immigration of Rajputs from Mewar to Himalayas in the late 12th century after the battle between Chittor and Muhammad Ghori. Historian John T Hitchcock and John Whelpton contends that the regular invasions by Muslims led to heavy influx of Rajputs with Brahmins from the 12th century.

The Hindu immigrants including Rajputs were mixed into the Khas society quickly as a result of much resemblance. The entry of Rajputs in the central Nepal were easily assisted by Khas Malla rulers who had developed a large feudatory state covering more than half of the greater Nepal. Also, the Magar tribesmen of Western Nepal welcomed the immigrant Rajput chiefs with much cordiality. After the late 13th century, the Khas Empire collapsed and was divided into Baise Rajya (22 principalities) in Karnali-Bheri region and Chaubise rajya (24 principalities) in Gandaki region. These Baise and Chaubise kingdoms were ruled by Rajputs and several decentralized tribal polities. Historian and Jesuit Ludwig Stiller contends that the Rajput intervention to the political affairs of Khas Malla Kingdom was significant reason behind the disintegration of the kingdom and he further conjectures:
 

After the Rajput immigration in Western Nepal, Shah dynasty and their Thakuri clans began claiming descent from Rajput refugees of Chittor whose fort was sieged twice by the Muslim invaders in 1303 and 1568. The Raja Vamshavali (royal genealogy) written by Chitravilasa on the instigation of King Rama Shah of Gorkha Kingdom as well as the Goraksha Vamshavali (Goraksha genealogy) links the royal dynasty of Gorkha to the ruling Rawal Rajput family of Chittor. Richard Temple asserts that the some of the ruling dynasties of Nepal valley were of patrilineal "Aryan Rajput" descent and matrilineal aboriginal descent. He further contends that the royal house of Gorkha were such half-caste Rajputs. Thakuris who are regarded as ruling clans of Nepal are also referred to as Rajputs. Prayag Raj Sharma mentions that the Rajputs referred in the Muluki Ain (Legal Code) were Thakuris.

Kanwar, a historical Chhetri clan, self pro-claimed descent from Rana Rajputs of Chittor and received the title of Rana. The older version of their genealogy states that Kunwars were descended from a Rajput prince, Ram Singh Rana, a grand-nephew of the ruler of Mewar. The newer version of their origin published by Prabhakar, Gautam and Pashupati Shamsher Jang Bahadur Rana states that they were descended from Kunwar Kumbhakaran Singh, younger brother of Guhila King of Mewar, Rawal Ratnasimha. During the first siege of Chittorgarh in 1303 A.D., Kumbhakaran Singh's descendants left Mewar to north towards Himalayan foothills.

History

Lichchavi Rajputras

Lichhavis were the first Nepalese dynasty of Indian plain origin who began their rule in the 4th or 5th century. Historian Baburam Acharya in an interview asserts that Amshuverma and the Lichhavi rulers were all Rajputs and Kshatriyas. Lichchavi inscription self describes them as Rajputras (princes). Rajputras who were ranked Kshatriyas, had special role in politics during the Lichchavi period. The Lichchavi inscription of Sikubahi (Shankhamul) mentions about Rajputra  Vajraratha, Rajputra Babharuvarma, and Rajputra Deshavarma. Rajputra Babharuvarma and Rajputra Deshavarma were Dutakas (diplomats) in the reign of King Gangadeva and Amshuvarma respectively.  Similarly, the Lichchavi inscription of Sanga mentions the name of Rajputra Vikramasena who was a Dandanayaka (judge). The Lichchavi inscription of Deopatan mentions Rajputra Shurasena as well as the inscriptions of Adeshwar mention the names of Rajputra Nandavarma, Rajputra Jishnuvarma and Rajputra Bhimavarma. Thus, historian Dhanavajra Vajracharya concludes that Rajputra of Kshatriya ranks were found abundantly in the topmost position in the Lichchavi court.

Khas Rajputs (Thakuri and Chhetri) 
The Baleshwar Inscription of King Krachalla (or Krachalla Deva) of Khas Malla Kingdom at capital Dullu self proclaimed that he belonged to a Buddhist Jina family of hill Rajput background. The inscription mentions his two regional chiefs (Mandalikas) as Rawat Rajas.

Few groups of Hindus including Rajputs were entering Nepal before the fall of Chittor due to regular invasions of Muslims in India. After the Fall of Chittorgarh in 1303 by the Alauddin Khilji of the Khalji dynasty, Rajputs from the region immigrated in large groups into Nepal due to heavy religious persecution. The incident is supported by both the Rajasthani and Nepalese traditions. Indian scholar Rahul Ram asserts that the Rajput immigration into Nepal is an undoubted fact but there can be questions in purity of blood of some leading families. Historian James Todd mentions that there was a one Rajasthani tradition that mentions the immigration of Rajputs from Mewar to Himalayas in the late 12th century after the battle between Chittor and Muhammad Ghori. Historian John T Hitchcock and John Whelpton contends that the regular invasions by Muslims led to heavy influx of Rajputs with Brahmins from the 12th century.

The Hindu immigrants including Rajputs were mixed into the Khas society quickly as a result of much resemblance. The entry of Rajputs in the central Nepal were easily assisted by Khas Malla rulers who had developed a large feudatory state covering more than half of the greater Nepal. Also, the Magar tribesmen of Western Nepal welcomed the immigrant Rajput chiefs with much cordiality. After the late 13th century, the Khas Empire collapsed and was divided into Baise Rajya (22 principalities) in Karnali-Bheri region and Chaubise rajya (24 principalities) in Gandaki region. These Baise and Chaubise kingdoms were ruled by Rajputs and several decentralized tribal polities. Historian and Jesuit Ludwig Stiller contends that the Rajput intervention to the political affairs of Khas Malla Kingdom was significant reason behind the disintegration of the kingdom and he further conjectures:
 

After the Rajput immigration in Western Nepal, Shah dynasty and their Thakuri clans began claiming descent from Rajput refugees of Chittor whose fort was sieged twice by the Muslim invaders in 1303 and 1568. The Raja Vamshavali (royal genealogy) written by Chitravilasa on the instigation of King Rama Shah of Gorkha Kingdom as well as the Goraksha Vamshavali (Goraksha genealogy) links the royal dynasty of Gorkha to the ruling Rawal Rajput family of Chittor. Richard Temple asserts that the some of the ruling dynasties of Nepal valley were of patrilineal "Aryan Rajput" descent and matrilineal aboriginal descent. He further contends that the royal house of Gorkha were such half-caste Rajputs. Thakuris who are regarded as ruling clans of Nepal are also referred to as Rajputs. Prayag Raj Sharma mentions that the Rajputs referred in the Muluki Ain (Legal Code) were Thakuris.

Kanwar, a historical Chhetri clan, self pro-claimed descent from Rana Rajputs of Chittor and received the title of Rana. The older version of their genealogy states that Kunwars were descended from a Rajput prince, Ram Singh Rana, a grand-nephew of the ruler of Mewar. The newer version of their origin published by Prabhakar, Gautam and Pashupati Shamsher Jang Bahadur Rana states that they were descended from Kunwar Kumbhakaran Singh, younger brother of Guhila King of Mewar, Rawal Ratnasimha. During the first siege of Chittorgarh in 1303 A.D., Kumbhakaran Singh's descendants left Mewar to north towards Himalayan foothills.

Newar Rajputs (Newar Malla, Thakurs, and Chatharīya)

In 1380 A.D., the last Baish Thakuri King, Arjun Dev or Arjun Malla, was ousted by his ministers and was displaced by a Rajput King Sthiti Malla. Sthiti Malla self proclaimed as a Kshatriya of Sun-god descent.  Sthiti Malla's successor, King Jyotir Malla and his successors invited Rajput families from Uttar Pradesh and Bihar, and began marital relations with them. The sons of Jyotirmalla were given the Rajput surname Singh while other sons were given the surname Malla. Rajput bridegrooms were procured from Bihar regions and were married to their daughters of the Malla rulers. These Rajput son-in-laws were included in the gotra of the Malla rulers and the son-in-law who lived with their Malla father-in-laws were given the surname Singh. Thus, the Rajput families became courtiers at Nepal and created a new endogamous courtier (Bharadari=Bharo) class.

Rajput influx also occurred in the 14th century with the arrival of Karnat king Hari Simha Dev (14th century CE) and the entourage that came along with him to Kathmandu Valley with the attack of the Tirhut kingdom by Ghiyath al-Din Tughluq of Tughluq dynasty in 1324 CE. These Rajputs similarly established marriage alliances with the existing Malla kings. These Mallas and its courtier clans have now coalesced into a single caste group of Newar Kshatriya caste, locally called Chatharīya, which is believed to be the derivative of the word ‘Kshatriya’, the second varna of the traditional Hindu varnashrama comprising kings, warriors and administrators. The Chatharīyas consider themselves as the Raghuvamshi Kṣatriya descendants of the Karnat king Hari Simha Dev (14th century CE) and the Rajput entourage that came along with him.  The Rajput clans that arrived at this time, and that have been transformed as present surnames among the Chatharīyas, include Raghuvanshi, Rawal, Raithor, Chauhan, Chandel, and Hada. The presence of these notable present Chatharīya clan titles clearly non-indigenous to the Newars that are still prevalent among the present-day Rajputs of India has been suggested as evidence of the Chatharīya's claim to their ancestry. Additionally, these Rajput descendants who are seen as the highest segments of the present-day Chatharīya caste; clans like Malla, Pradhan, Pradhananga, Patrabansh, Bharo, Raghubanshi, Rajbansh, Rajbhandari, Onta, Amatya, Chauhan, Raithor, etc. are given the highest "Thakur/Thakoo" status, while other Chatharīyas are lesser elevated, albeit still retaining their Chatharī/Kșatriya status. These Thakurs and Chatharīyas, are nonetheless, accorded the second highest caste-status among Newars after the Rajopadhyaya Brahmins.

In Jang Bahadur Rana's caste ordering in the Muluki Ain, Chatharīyas were placed among the Tagadhari dwij-jati status of upper twice-born castes. The Muluki Ain refers them as tharghar ra asal sresth pointing out to the clans/houses as being of noble descent and being a real Shrestha, the archaic honorific term.

Modern era: Terai Rajputs
Today, only Madheshi/Terai Rajputs still list themselves as Rajputs in Nepal's census where as Newar and Khas Kshatriyas are counted separately. As per the 2011 Nepal census, the population of Madhesi/Terai Rajputs is reported at 41,972. The caste with the largest ratio of representation in the civil service in Nepal is, the Rajput, who have a presence in the civil service that is 5.6 times that of their presence in the population.

See also
Caste system in Nepal
Hinduism in Nepal
Tagadhari
Rana dynasty
bhati
Thakuri

Notes

References

Books

  

 

Rajputs
Nepalese people of Indian descent
History of Nepal
Nepalese Hindus